A dialect coach is an acting coach who helps an actor design the voice and speech of a character in the context of an on-camera (film, television or commercial), stage (theatre, musical theatre, opera, etc.), radio or animation voiceover production. The dialect coach often does original research on dialects and speech patterns, prepares training materials, provides instruction and works on lines with the actor. A dialect coach will give the actor feedback focusing on issues of credibility, consistency, and clarity. A dialect coach may also be employed to help comedians hone impressions of celebrities, to train non-actor public speakers in vocal character and delivery, or to help singers improve in diction and attain a balance between tone and articulation, especially when singing in a second language.

Terminology

The term dialect coach persists as the primary designation for an accent or language coach in the US and Canadian entertainment businesses. However, other designations may also be used. Some dialect coaches will refer to themselves as dialogue coaches (or, occasionally, by the historical designation, dialogue directors), especially when working on a second language or when offering acting coaching on straight dialogue in the performer's own language or dialect.

In the opera world, coaches who help opera singers with articulation of lyrics (often in an unfamiliar language, such as Russian or Czech) are called diction coaches. In the United Kingdom, dialect coaches are generally called accent coaches and are not acting coaches.

The term voice coach is applied to those who work with breathing, voice and text in the theatre in the UK, though this usage is not common in the US film and television businesses where the term "voice coach" would generally be understood to refer to a singing coach (a.k.a., a vocal coach).

Likewise, on US stage productions the term voice coach is also avoided to prevent confusion with either a vocal (singing) coach or someone who coaches actors in techniques for inducing a state of heightened relaxation prior to a rehearsal or performance, and who may offer guidance on breath support or vocal practices intended to promote effective placement of resonances in the upper body, the actor's availability of expression and appropriate projection.

Activities
In some cases, voice warm-up coaching integrates full-body work in yoga, movement or balance. Many actors believe that such warm-ups and exercises reduce the likelihood of vocal damage, most especially during expression of high intensity emotion outdoors or in a large performing venue in the absence of electronic amplification (e.g., microphones and a PA system). A dialect coach may also be engaged to coach voice issues in this latter sense in conjunction with theatrical dialect coaching. Not every dialect coach has the training and knowledge to also do vocal coaching in a singing sense.

Hiring and management

On-camera productions
On a film or television production, dialect coaches are typically hired by the line producer during pre-production to begin preparing cast far in advance of the first day of principal photography. If engaged during principal photography, it is the unit production manager, production manager, production supervisor, production coordinator or, in some cases, executive producer who is likely to interview prospective coaches in behalf of the production. If engaged only during post-production, the coach may even be hired directly by the post producer. In advance of being hired, coaches may be interviewed by the showrunner or a staff writer in the case of episodic television or by the film director in the case of a feature film. Dialect coaches may work with any members of the cast, but are brought in especially often to work with celebrity actors who have been cast in roles which require accents other than their own or even the performance of dialogue in languages unknown to the actors. Therefore, frequently, the actors themselves will ask Production to hire a particular coach.

However the coach comes to be hired, the creatives will often consult with the dialect coach early in the process in order to acquaint the dialect coach with the overall creative vision and to start the actor as early as possible to allow time for the character's voice to become fully integrated by the actor prior to the actor's first shoot day. Once hired, the coach will typically prepare actors over a number of sessions either remotely, on set, at the Production Office or in the actor's own home. Coaches who work in serialized television are expected to be especially flexible as there may be no opportunity for a meeting between the episode director and coach, as shooting scripts may not be finalized until very close to the day of the shoot and as last-minute casting decisions and limitations on actor-availability may make it difficult to schedule advance coaching.

During production, the key second assistant director typically schedules coaching sessions. Many creatives will ask that the coach be present at read-throughs or story conferences, at production meetings (if serving as key coach) and during at least some first-team rehearsals. While a shot is set up, the coach will be kept in close proximity to the actors to be coached. Often, the coach will be assigned a dressing room, or, on location, a room in the honeywagon, double-banger or triple-banger near the actors' trailers. On set, the dialect coach will be issued a wireless headset and given a chair (exclusive, if on set regularly) in video village in order to facilitate access to the director and to the script supervisor who may be asked by the coach to relay notes on pronunciation and clarity, particularly if the dialogue is in dialect or language unfamiliar to the post-production team. An on-set coach may also work with an actor between takes if needed, especially on last minute changes to the script. Later, the coach may be brought back for dubbing or to pick up new lines during the post-production process, sometimes via a feed from a remote studio when the actors are no-longer available in person.

Stage productions
On a stage production, dialect coaches are typically brought in by a director or artistic director with contractual terms negotiated by a producer or general manager. Coaches work closely with the production stage manager who coordinates meetings with the director and coaching sessions for the cast collectively or individually. The coach will often also be present to give notes to the actors at some rehearsals, partial runs and full runs. Coaching typically takes place throughout the rehearsal process, but especially before the actors begin memorizing their lines and again after the show is loaded into the performance space. Understudies may be coached alongside the principal performers or after the show goes into previews. Coaching may continue in a limited way during a run.

Status and compensation
In the film and television businesses, dialect coaches are very well paid. Coaches are customarily given on-screen credits for their work on films and for substantial contributions to serialized television. The wording of the credit may vary with the specific requirements of the production. On some shows, dialect coaches may be asked to contribute intellectual property to the production in the form of, for instance, dialogue polishing in English or other languages. They may serve as technical consultants in the areas of culture and written language. They often guide, or engage with, the cast's process of creating a character and consult on the overall vocal design for the production. Consequently, the deal memos for coaches may include compensation terms that are not typical for crew positions, leading to the adage that dialect coaches are neither above-the-line nor below-the-line, but on-the-line.

In the Republic of Ireland, South Africa, the UK and the US, dialect coaches remain among a very small minority of production staff who are not unionized; their deals may differ in substance from production to production in these jurisdictions. In Australia and New Zealand, dialect coaches who are employed on a film or theatre set are covered under the Media, Entertainment and Arts Alliance. On English-language Canadian film and television productions, dialect coaches are unionized under the Alliance of Canadian Cinema, Television and Radio Artists. Coaches are not unionized under the Union des artistes for French-language productions in Canada.

In the theater, coaches who help actors hone dialects or character voices typically seek compensation on a par with designers and may be credited as dialect coaches, dialect designers or voice and speech directors. Dialect coaches are not unionized for live performances in Canada, the Republic of Ireland, South Africa, the UK or the US.

There is no membership branch of the Academy of Motion Picture Arts and Sciences that incorporates dialect coaching, nor is there a peer group of the Academy of Television Arts and Sciences that accords active membership status to coaches.

Cost-cutting for low-budget productions
Due to budget constraints, producers of student films and stage plays, showcase theater and slimly financed independent films and web series may avoid hiring a dialect coach, and instead substitute the services of a low-paid or volunteer native speaker model in hopes that the actors will be able to learn mimetically, retain the accent and act in it without expert guidance or monitoring. In some such cases, cast members may themselves pay a coach, sometimes in consultation with the director, though employing crew is not normally regarded as a cast member's responsibility. In other cases, actors may attempt to self-study the dialect using commercially available training materials or web-based voice archives which host native-speaker recordings of oral histories or interviews or other scripted speech. The majority of such archives also provide native-speaker recordings of phonemically balanced narrative passages, especially Comma Gets a Cure, which is structured around the lexical sets of English and other phonological patterns of potential interest to the student of dialect.

Job prospects
While there are many hundreds of voice and speech trainers connected with drama courses throughout the English-speaking world who may control a stock of stage dialects for general use, far fewer specialize in dialect coaching. A web search of dialect coaches with Internet Movie Database listings produces fewer than 100 living film and TV coaches worldwide, the majority showing few recent jobs, credited or uncredited. Most of these dialect coaches work on an ad hoc basis on individual productions. However, in some cases, a coach may become attached to a theatre company as a resident voice and speech director, especially if the coach has a second specialization (esp. Shakespeare or voice). As with many aspects of the entertainment business, entry into the field of dialect coaching is very competitive. Because dialect coaches are not always called for every day of a shoot, many coaches find a way to supplement income while maintaining their availability for coaching, often by acting, directing (including animation voice directing), teaching in related areas (public speaking, etc.) or taking on private students, especially for auditions. Outside of the entertainment businesses based in English-speaking countries, dialect coaching is less common, and opportunities rarer.

Professional societies
Dialect coaches, especially those who teach in theater education programs, may become active in such professional societies as the Australian Voice Association, the British Voice Association, the International Centre for Voice and the Voice and Speech Trainers Association.

See also
Acting coach

Notes and references

Filmmaking occupations
Theatre
Occupations in music
Theatrical occupations
Temporary employment
Coaching